Benner may refer to:

 Benner (surname)
 Benner Township, Pennsylvania
 Benner, United States Virgin Islands
 USS Benner, the name of more than one United States Navy ship